Richard Jeranian 17 July 1921 – 10 October 2019) was an Armenian painter, draftsman and lithographer active in France.

Biography 
In the 1930s, when Armenia belonged to the Transcaucasian Socialist Federative Soviet Republic, Richard Jeranian went into exile in France. Interested in  art and music, he began his studies in Marseille where the landscapes of Provence inspired him, he pursued his studies in Paris at the Académie Julian and at the Académie de la Grande Chaumière. In 1944 he was called to serve in the air force and was sent to Algiers, then to Fez where he remained until 1946.

After the war, being  closely connected with artists from the  Armenian diaspora, he traveled and exhibited in Lebanon, Soviet Russia and Iran, he also visited his native land in connection with the Calouste Gulbenkian Foundation efforts in support of Armenia . During the 1998 earthquake, he participated with other artists in donations for the creation of a children hospital after the disaster.

The style of his works evolved, going through figurative, surrealist, cubist or abstract periods covering the themes of music, woman and Armenia through figures, landscapes, genre scenes or still lifes in oil and ink. He died in October 2019 at the age of 98.

Collections 
 Pushkin Museum of Fine Arts, Moscow.
 National Gallery of Armenia

Awards 
 Silver medal of the city of Paris, 1955 
 Ordre des Arts et des Lettres, 1959
 Martiros Sarian National Prize for Painting, 1987
 Khorenatsi medal Cultural Prize of Armenia, 2011

Bibliography 
 Richard Jeranian [Texte imprimé] : 60 ans de peinture évolutive Paris  cop. 2006

References

External links 
  Richard Jeranian on Stephanies Gallery
 Richard Jeranian on Artnet
 Richard Jeranian Website 

1921 births
2019 deaths
20th-century Armenian painters
Académie Julian alumni
People from Sivas
Turkish people of Armenian descent